Next, Please! is a 1930 German comedy film directed by Erich Schönfelder and starring Charles Puffy, Adele Sandrock, and Albert Paulig.

The film's sets were designed by the art directors Gustav A. Knauer and Willy Schiller. It was released by the German branch of Universal Pictures.

Cast
Charles Puffy as Ludwig König
Adele Sandrock as Tante Auguste
Albert Paulig as Knorr von Bremshaus
Lien Deyers as Minchen Bangigkeit
Rolf von Goth as Hans
Siegfried Berisch as Mäxchen
Lotte Stein as Hulda Murmel

References

External links

1930 comedy films
German comedy films
Films of the Weimar Republic
German silent feature films
Films directed by Erich Schönfelder
German black-and-white films
Universal Pictures films
Silent comedy films
1930s German films